Distance is the second studio Japanese album (third overall) released by Japanese-American singer Hikaru Utada on March 28, 2001 through Toshiba-EMI.

Distance is the second-best-selling album in Japan of all time with over 5.4 million copies sold, and sold over three million copies in its debut week, setting Japan's one-week sales record and the world's highest one-week sales in a single territory, Hamasaki's album having the second highest ever, a record held by the two albums until 2015, when Adele's third album 25 sold 3.4 million copies in its first week in the United States. According to Oricon, Distance is the highest selling Japanese album of the decade.

Globally, the album was one of the best-selling of 2001, being listed at number 10 on the International Federation of the Phonographic Industry's Top 50 Global Best Selling Albums list for 2001.

Production
For this album, Utada worked with American producers for a few tracks: Rodney Jerkins, who has worked with the likes of Janet Jackson, Michael Jackson and Toni Braxton, produced (and performed rap vocals on) the track "Time Limit", while songwriters Jimmy Jam and Terry Lewis produced both "Wait & See (Risk)" and the Up-in-Heaven mix of "Addicted to You".

The melody of "Kotoba ni Naranai Kimochi" was originally introduced on the track "Interlude" found on the First Love album. Due to time constraints, the song could not be finished on time for release in full on First Love, and was carried over to this album. The title of the track "Hayatochi-remix" is a portmanteau Utada created of "Hayatochiri", the name of the original song on the "Wait & See (Risk)" single, and the word "remix".

The song "Distance" was originally planned to be a single without any alterations, but it was instead released in a rearranged ballad form called "Final Distance" in memory of a fan who died in the June 2001 Osaka school massacre; this new version would appear on their next album, Deep River.

The cover art for the album, as well as the whole album photography, was done by their then-husband and director Kazuaki Kiriya.

Track listing

Singles
The singles released from Distance would become the biggest hits of Utada's career in terms of physical sales. Three of the four singles sold at least a million units, earning a Million certification from the RIAJ and making the Top 100 list of best-selling singles in Japan, while "For You" / "Time Limit" fell just short of that mark, selling just a little over 900K (909,000).

Personnel
Miyake Akira – producer
Nishihira Akira – arranger, keyboards, programming
David Barry – guitar
John Blackwell – drums
Darnell Davis – keyboards
Paul Foley – editing
Steve Hodge – engineer, mixing
Goh Hotoda – engineer, shaker, mixing
Jimmy Jam – arranger, producer, musician
Ted Jensen – mastering
Rodney Jerkins – arranger, programming, producer, engineer, rap
Terry Lewis – arranger, producer, musician
Harvey Mason, Jr. – engineer, editing
Michael McCoy – assistant engineer
Alexander Richbourg – producer, drum programming
Philippe Saisse – keyboards
Dexter Simmons – mixing
Xavier Smith – drum programming, assistant engineer
Mike Tocci – assistant engineer
Sanada Yoshiaki – executive producer
Honda Yuichiro – guitar, arranger, keyboards, programming, pre-production arranger
Toriyama Yuji – guitar

Charts
Japan (Oricon)

See also
List of fastest-selling albums

References

2001 albums
Hikaru Utada albums
Albums produced by Rodney Jerkins
Albums produced by Jimmy Jam and Terry Lewis
Japanese-language albums
Universal Music Japan albums